Comstock Records is an independent American record label. Established and managed by Frank Fara and Patty Parker, Comstock achieved international success in the 1980s and 1990s by producing country music records for international artists. Several Comstock artists charted nationally and internationally, and many were nominated for Country Music awards.

Founders 
Co-founder Frank Fara grew up in Phoenix, Arizona. Under his birth name, Frank Fafara, he enjoyed a brief recording career as a Teen Idol in the early 1960s and had several regional hits. His first recording "Only in My Dreams" went to number #5 on the Phoenix Top Ten radio charts. His song was given a B+ from Cashbox magazine, and Billboard magazine gave him a three star rating He made frequent appearances at the Phoenix Rock'n Roll club, Stage 7, and opened for artists such as Conway Twitty, Del Shannon and the Everly Brothers. He was also regularly featured on the local TV shows Teen Beat and The Wallace and Ladmo Show. As an adult he changed his last name to Fara and moved to California, where he started a country music band which began touring as The Frank Fara Show.

Co-Founder Patty Parker grew up Shawnee, Kansas. In college she earned her degree in music education and toured with the John Brown University vocal gospel ensemble The Harmonaires. After college she worked for three years as a music teacher but  moved to California to pursue her dream of becoming a singer. In California, Parker met Fara and she began singing and playing the drums in their traveling road show. When audiences reacted enthusiastically to her performances, the band renamed the show, The Frank Fara Show featuring Patty Parker. Parker later performed as a background vocalist for hundreds of Nashville recordings.

History 
In the mid 1970s Fara and Parker toured the Nevada casino circuit and major venues across the US and Canada. Each time they visited a city, their first stop was to the local radio station where they presented their latest single release. Over time, they visited hundreds of DJs and radio stations and as a result, their music was played on radio stations across North America.

Fara and Parker married, and after five years of touring, they transitioned out of the road show and into the record business. While creating their own album, Parker discovered she preferred time in the studio over a life of touring. The couple launched Comstock Records in 1978 and named the company after the Comstock Lode, a gold and silver mine in Virginia City, Nevada.

Parker became Comstock's producer and Fara focused on marketing and promotions. Parker was one of Nashville's first female Independent Country music producers.

In 1988 Comstock moved its studio to Scottsdale, Arizona but continued to provide the same production and promotion services.

Comstock formed a subsidiary label, Paylode, which featured adult contemporary and pop artists, and two publishing companies White Cat (ASCAP) and Rocky Bell (BMI).

European interest
Comstock Records discovered that artists in Canada and Europe were interested in recording Country music songs. To the artists Comstock accepted - typically professional singers who had not been accepted by major labels-Comstock offered a recording service which included rehearsal, two original songs produced by Parker, an authentic Nashville band, a recording session in a top Nashville studio, and the promise to distribute their songs to music critics and international radio stations.

Many of these artists wanted to sing like American Country music stars and requested coaching to perfect their dialect. To help artists pronounce words, Parker would often write song lyrics phonetically and provide audio tapes illustrating the country-western way of enunciating.

Comstock produced artists from Australia, Canada, Croatia, Ireland, Sweden, the USA, and elsewhere.

Successful artists 
Comstock's first artist, Alex Fraser, achieved immediate success with his album Four States to Go which hit #9 on the Canadian Country charts. Due to his album's success, he received nominations, appearances on TV shows, and a national distribution deal.

The O'Roark Brothers had three singles make the U.S. Country charts, "Long Time Comin,'" "A Woman Like You" and "You're Going Out of My Mind." In 1980 they were chosen to appear on the Music City News Cover Awards Show in Nashville.

In October 1984, Billie J. Helmkay reached number 88 on the Cash Box Top 100 Country Singles chart with the song, "You're Spreadin' My Hurt Around." This song was also listed under the "Recommended" Country section of the October 1984 Billboard Singles Reviews. She also made a TV appearance on the show Big Sky Country.

In the mid-1980s Anne Lord won three Danny Molson Awards (Vancouver, British Columbia) for Female Vocalist of the Year and a Horizon Award for most notable newcomer. She received six Canadian Country Music Award nominations, and in 1984 was nominated for a Juno Award for Best Country Female Vocalist. Her song "Nobody Said" reached #26 on the Australian top 40 charts, and received airplay on stations in Britain, Holland, France and Germany.

Inger Nordstrom and Her Rhinestone Band received a nomination for a music award in Nashville, and earned the Critic's Choice Pick of the Week from Billboard Magazine. in 1991 she won Scandinavian Album of the Year with her record Cimarron County. In both 1992 and 1993, she and her band were named Scandinavian Country Performer of the Year. Their single "I Saw You Look At Her" peaked at #5 on the Indie Bullet Chart. Inger also hosted her own country music show on Swedish radio.

Thirteen Comstock Artists made the Nashville Top 40 Indie World charts, 31 Comstock artists made the Top 50 charts in the European Country Music Association (ECMA), and 24 Comstock acts made New York's Music Review National Top 30 charts.

Awards and honors 
In 1985 Comstock earned ten nominations from the Canadian Country Music Association, including one for Record Company of the Year.

In 1986, five Comstock records made the Cash Box Top 100.

In 1998 Comstock was awarded Indie Label of the Year in Europe by the ECMA.

Several Comstock produced videos found frequent rotation on Country Music Television and The Nashville Network.

In 1986, Fara wrote the book How to Open Doors in the Music Industry the Independent Way. Parker contributed a chapter called "The Producer."

Legacy 
Much of the Comstock catalog now resides with Fervor Records, which has placed many of their songs in TV and film.

Discography

Film and television

References 

American country music record labels
Record labels based in Arizona
American independent record labels